Schönbaum or Schoenbaum is a German surname. Notable people with the surname include:

 Alex Schoenbaum (1915–1996), American football player and businessman
 Charles Schoenbaum (1893–1951), cinematographer
 David Schoenbaum (born 1935), American social scientist
 Samuel Schoenbaum (1927–1996), Shakespearean biographer and scholar

See also 
 Schoenbaum Stadium, soccer stadium in Charleston, West Virginia

German-language surnames
Jewish surnames
Yiddish-language surnames